Dima Trofim (born 14 January 1989 in Chișinău, Moldova), is a Romanian singer, dancer, actor, and former member of the LaLa band.

He is known for his role as Dima Trofin in the TV series Pariu cu viața. He participated in the show Dansez pentru tine and in 2008–2009 at Stars Factory 1st edition, Moldova (in Romanian 'Fabrica de Staruri editia 1, R. Moldova'), he was among the finalists. Then he moved from Moldova to Romania.

In 2017, he auditioned for season 7 of The Voice of Romania singing "Fairytale" from Alexander Rybak. Two of the four judges, Loredana Groza and Smiley turned their chair. Trofim chose to be on Team Smiley.

Discography

Singles
Angel (2012)
Cerșesc Iubire (2014)
Stai Cu Mine (2014)
Cireș De Mai feat. Amna (2016)
Urzici (2017)
Du-mă Unde Vrei feat. What's UP (2021)

Filmography

Television series

TV Shows

References

Romanian actors
Romanian male dancers
1989 births
Living people